Washington is a city in south central Washington County, Utah, United States and is a part of the St. George Metropolitan Area. The area is also known as Utah's Dixie because the Mormon pioneers who settled the St. George area came to the area to raise cotton, which was milled at the cotton mill in Washington. The population was 27,993 as of 2020. Washington is a fast-growing suburb of St. George, and is the second largest city in Washington County.

The city was named after U.S. President George Washington. The city administration has tried to encourage the use of the name "Washington City" in recent years.  The U.S. Post Office lists "Washington, UT 84780."

Geography
According to the United States Census Bureau, the city has a total area of 32.5 square miles (85.2 km2), of which 32.5 square miles (85.1 km2) is land and 0.07 square mile (0.1 km2) (0.10%) is water.

Demographics

As of the census of 2000, there were 8,186 people, 2,614 households, and 2,117 families residing in the city. The racial makeup of the city was 94.31% White, 0.37% African American, 1.71% Native American, 0.29% Asian, 0.10% Pacific Islander, 2.15% from other races, and 1.08% from two or more races. Hispanic or Latino of any race were 4.69% of the population.

There were 2,614 households, out of which 36.3% had children under the age of 18 living with them, 71.4% were married couples living together, 7.3% had a female householder with no husband present, and 19.0% were non-families. 16.6% of all households were made up of individuals, and 9.2% had someone living alone who was 65 years of age or older. The average household size was 3.00 and the average family size was 3.37.

In the city, the population was spread out, with 30.1% under the age of 18, 10.9% from 18 to 24, 22.6% from 25 to 44, 17.8% from 45 to 64, and 18.7% who were 65 years of age or older. The median age was 32 years. For every 100 females, there were 104.4 males. For every 100 females age 18 and over, there were 107.2 males.

The median income for a household in the city was $35,341, and the median income for a family was $39,003. Males had a median income of $28,750 versus $20,434 for females. The per capita income for the city was $14,032. About 7.5% of families and 7.9% of the population were below the poverty line, including 10.3% of those under age 18 and 1.1% of those age 65 or over.

Government
The City of Washington has five city council members: Councilwoman Kim Casperson, Councilman Craig Coats, Councilman Bret Henderson, Councilman Kurt Ivie, and Benjamin L Martinsen. Mayor Kress Staheli was elected in 2021 and has been mayor since January 2022. Washington uses a city manager to run the day-to-day activities. As of 2021, the city manager is Jeremy Redd, who was appointed in 2020.

See also

 List of cities and towns in Utah
 Elephant Arch

References

External links

 

Cities in the Mojave Desert
Cities in Utah
Populated places established in 1857
Cities in Washington County, Utah
1857 establishments in Utah Territory